The Hungaro Copter is a Hungarian helicopter produced by Hungaro Copter Limited of Verpelét, an affiliate of the Hungarian SteelRiders company. The lead engineer for the design was Zoltán Juhász. The aircraft is supplied as a kit for amateur construction.

Design and development
The aircraft was designed to comply with the European microlight aircraft rules. It features a single main rotor and tail rotor, a single-seat enclosed cockpit with a fairing, or an open cockpit without a windshield, skid landing gear and a four-cylinder, four stroke  Subaru EJ22 or  Subaru EJ25 automotive conversion engine. The six-cylinder  D-Motor LF39 powerplant has also been used.

The aircraft fuselage is made from welded steel tubing.

The construction time from the supplied kit is estimated as 300 hours.

Specifications (Hungaro Copter)

See also
List of rotorcraft

References

External links

Hungaro Copter
2010s Hungarian sport aircraft
2010s Hungarian ultralight aircraft
2010s Hungarian civil utility aircraft
2010s Hungarian helicopters
Homebuilt aircraft
Single-engined piston helicopters